The 2010 USA - Brazil Challenge was held February 5–7, 2010 at the Grafton Curling Club in Grafton, North Dakota. The challenge pitted the Brazilian National Curling Team against the Pete Fenson rink of Bemidji, Minnesota, representing the United States. The winning team  represented the second Americas team at the 2010 Capital One World Men's Curling Championship.

The series was a best-of-five.

Teams

Results

Game 1

Game 2

Game 3

External links
Results

USA-Brazil Challenge
2010 in American sports
Walsh County, North Dakota
Curling competitions in North Dakota
2010 in Brazilian sport
2010 in sports in North Dakota
Americas Challenge